Shahidullah Dulal is a Bangladeshi Cinematographer and cameraman. He won the Bangladesh National Film Award for Best Cinematography for the film Hason Raja (2002).

Selected films
 Harano Sur - 1987
 Khotipuron - 1989
 Ononto Bhalobasa -  1999
 Juari - 2001
 Hason Raja - 2002

Awards and nominations
National Film Awards

References

External links
 

Bangladeshi cinematographers
Best Cinematographer National Film Award (Bangladesh) winners
Year of birth missing (living people)
Living people